The following highways are numbered 4A:

United States
 Florida State Road 4A
 Illinois Route 4A
 Maine State Route 4A
Missouri Route 4A
 New Hampshire Route 4A
 New Jersey Route 4A (former)
 Vermont Route 4A

Territories
 Guam Highway 4A